Birds described in 1874 include Island leaf warbler, Bar-bellied pitta, Coppery-naped puffleg, Streak-throated barwing, Red-and-white spinetail,  Papuan hawk-owl, Bay-vented cotinga, Arfak catbird, Rufous-webbed brilliant

Events
Death of Ferdinand Stoliczka

Publications
Spencer Fullerton Baird, Thomas Mayo Brewer , and Robert Ridgway, 1874. A History of North American Birds: Land Birds. Little, Brown, Boston. Volume I, 596 pp.; Volume II, 590 pp.; Volume III, 560 pp. Retrieved 14 January 2013. A special edition, published in the same year, of 50 copies contained 36 plates hand-colored by Ridgway.[110]1873
Henry Haversham Godwin-Austen, Birds of Assam (1870–1878)
Richard Bowdler Sharpe,  Catalogue of the Birds in the British Museum London
Władysław Taczanowski 1874. Description des Oiseaux nouveaux du Pérou central Proceedings of the Zoological Society of London 1874
Etienne Mulsant, Histoire Naturelle des Oiseaux-Mouches, ou Colibris constituant la famille des Trochilides (published 1874-77)
Ongoing events
Theodor von Heuglin Ornithologie von Nordost-Afrika (Ornithology of Northeast Africa) (Cassel, 1869–1875)
John Gould The birds of Asia 1850-83 7 vols. 530 plates, Artists: J. Gould, H. C. Richter, W. Hart and J. Wolf; Lithographers:H. C. Richter and W. Hart
Henry Eeles Dresser and Richard Bowdler Sharpe  A History of the Birds of Europe, Including all the Species Inhabiting the Western Palearctic Region.Taylor & Francis of Fleet Street, London
Paolo Savi Ornitologia Italiana Firenze :Successori Le Monnier,1873-1876. (opera posthuma 1873–1876) 
The Ibis

References

Bird
Birding and ornithology by year